James Euringer (born September 7, 1969), known professionally as Jimmy Urine, is an American singer, songwriter, and musician. He is best known as the lead singer and programmer of electropunk band Mindless Self Indulgence.

Early life
James Euringer was born in New York City on September 7, 1969. He has a brother named Markus. He graduated from a Catholic high school and later attended an art school, but dropped out.

Career

Mindless Self Indulgence
Before starting Mindless Self Indulgence, Euringer took on the stage name Jimmy Urine and worked with his brother, releasing an album titled Mindless Self-Indulgence. The brothers became the founding members of Mindless Self Indulgence and soon found guitarist Steve Montano (Steve, Righ?) and drummer Jennifer Dunn (Kitty). The brothers released a second album, Crappy Little Demo, before Markus left the group and was replaced by bassist Vanessa Y.T., who was in turn replaced by Lindsey Way (Lyn-Z).

Other work
Urine has remixed songs by Serj Tankian, Grimes, Devo, Deep Forest, KoRn, and Serart. He has been known to completely restructure the songs he remixes as well as add his own vocal parts. He also produced the original version of "Revolution" by Aimee Allen.

Urine and his MSI bandmate Steve, Righ? have a side project called The Left Rights. They have released a self-titled album and a second album titled Bad Choices Made Easy.

Urine worked as a composer for the 2012 video game Lollipop Chainsaw, in which he also voiced the character Zed. He provided the voice for The Body in M Dot Strange's 2012 animated film Heart String Marionette. He also appeared in Darren Lynn Bousman's 2015 musical horror film Alleluia! The Devil's Carnival.

Urine played a Ravager named Half-Nut in the 2017 film Guardians of the Galaxy Vol. 2 He also wrote a song for the film called "Un Deye Gon Hayd (The Unloved Song)", which is heard during the scene on the planet Contraxia. The song does not appear on the soundtrack album. In 2017, the song was uploaded to YouTube.

Urine released a self-titled album under the name Euringer in October 2018. The album features appearances from Tankian, Grimes, Gerard Way, and Chantal Claret.

In 2020, Urine voiced Kid K Beatz in two episodes of the cyberpunk musical web series X-RL7. That same year, Urine and Tankian released the collaborative album Fuktronic.

Personal life
Euringer married singer and musician Chantal Claret on January 18, 2008. The couple relocated to New Zealand in 2018, settling in Wellington. Their identical twin daughters were born in 2019.

Legal issues 
While performing with Mindless Self Indulgence in Michigan in 1999, Euringer was arrested for indecent exposure and spent a night in jail after he exposed his penis onstage.

On August 9, 2021, a lawsuit was filed against Euringer in New York Supreme Court with the charge of sexual battery of a minor. The accuser, whose identity was left anonymous because she was a minor at the time, claims that she had a sexual relationship with Euringer from January 1997 to June 1999 which started when she was 15 years old and Euringer was 27. The suit alleges that Euringer "groomed and manipulated [her] into believing that his sexually assaultive behavior was not criminal and that by engaging in sexual activity with him [she] was actually helping to protect younger girls from sexual assaults". Euringer also allegedly wrote her a letter wishing her a happy fifteenth birthday. The suit added, "During this time, Euringer acted as and treated [her] as though she was his girlfriend and the two were in a consensual relationship." It is alleged that Euringer took pictures of the plaintiff naked throughout the relationship and requested that she "act like a small child, suck her thumb, drool, and pee in her pants" during sexual acts. Euringer also allegedly bought her a fake ID so she could go to concerts with him and drink alcohol. After the girl was convinced they were in a relationship, Euringer allegedly tried to hide their relationship by telling her not to act affectionately with him while in public. The lawsuit claims that the woman has suffered emotional distress since the relationship started.

Discography

With Mindless Self Indulgence

With The Left Rights
The Left Rights (2002)
Bad Choices Made Easy (2010)

As Jimmy Urine
The Secret Cinematic Sounds of Jimmy Urine (2017)

As Euringer
Euringer (2018)

Jimmy Urine & Serj Tankian
Fuktronic (2020)

References

External links
 Mindless Self Indulgence Official Website
 Mindless Self Indulgence on MySpace

1969 births
American rock singers
American alternative rock musicians
Alternative rock singers
American industrial musicians
American punk rock singers
Living people
Singers from New York City